Taliek Brown (born June 23, 1982) is an American former professional basketball player.

High school career 
Brown played high school basketball at St. John's Preparatory School in Astoria, Queens, New York. He averaged 22.5 points and 6.6 assists per game as a senior. A Parade All-American, Brown was ranked among the top 25 high school recruits in the United States and was chosen to play at the 2000 McDonald's All-American Game and at the Roundball Classic All-Star game, after which he was named Most Valuable Player. As a McDonald's All-American, he recorded 11 points, 6 assists and 4 rebounds.

College career 
Brown played college basketball with Connecticut because of "their winning tradition, the great players they had come through here, and just the whole total UConn. This is a big program." 

As a freshman, Brown was the starting point guard in all 32 of UConn's games. He scored a season-high 21 points against the nationally ranked Boston College on February 13, 2001, and recorded a season-best 12 assists in an overtime win over St. John's on January 6. After his second season, Brown was averaging 9.2 points and 5.1 assists per game. He recorded the second-most assists for a sophomore in college history, scoring 172. At the 2002 Big East men's basketball tournament championship, he made a half-court shot at the closing seconds to seal the game against the Pittsburgh Panthers. Brown led UConn to an NCAA Division I Basketball title in 2004, as his team defeated the Georgia Tech Yellow Jackets to close his senior season.

Professional career 
After leaving UConn, Brown performed workouts for the 2004 NBA draft, but was undrafted.

References 

1982 births
Living people
Basketball players from New York City
American expatriate basketball people in Bulgaria
American expatriate basketball people in Canada
American expatriate basketball people in Croatia
American expatriate basketball people in North Macedonia
American expatriate basketball people in Turkey
American men's basketball players
Halifax Rainmen players
Karşıyaka basketball players
KK Cibona players
McDonald's High School All-Americans
Moncton Miracles players
Parade High School All-Americans (boys' basketball)
PBC Academic players
Sportspeople from Queens, New York
UConn Huskies men's basketball players
Point guards